Buffalo Trace Park is a  public park preserve in northern Harrison County, Indiana near the town of Palmyra, Indiana. The park is along the edge of the old Buffalo Trace, a historic bison migration trail that was later converted into a road. In 1971, the  man-made Lake Coleman was added to the park and stocked with fish, and is maintained by the Indiana Department of Natural Resources. The park's amenities include public camping, fishing, a public beach, petting zoo, walking paths, playgrounds, boating, an 18 hole disc golf course and ball courts. The park is owned by Harrison County and managed by the Harrison County Park and Recreation Department.

See also
 List of parks in the Louisville metropolitan area

External links

Protected areas of Harrison County, Indiana
Parks in Indiana